Leqa Naqamte, also known as Leqa Neqemte, was a polity from 1841 to 1897 in what later became the Welega Province of Ethiopia. It was formed as an outgrowth of the power of the city of Nekemte which remained its capital. Its growth came as a result of the power-extending policies of Bekere Godana. In 1897 it was incorporated into Ethiopia by the expansionist policies of Menelik.

Moti = Rulers

See also
 Monarchies of Ethiopia
 Rulers and heads of state of Ethiopia

References

 
Leqa Naqamte
Leqa
Oromo royal families